HSU-001 is a class of Chinese unmanned underwater vehicle.

Overview
The HSU-001 is a Large Displacement Unmanned Underwater Vehicle (LDUUV).

The actual capabilities of HSU-001 are largely unknown. The HSU-001 is thought to be optimized for seabed warfare.

The HSU-001 has limited endurance and is expected to be complemented by longer range UUVs in Chinese service.

History
The HSU-001 was exhibited for the first time at the People’s Republic of China’s 70th anniversary parade in 2019.

Specification
Very little technical details of HSU-001 has been released to the public by the Chinese government, and as of early 2020s, only the following information is known:
Length: 5 meter
Diameter: 1 meter
Weight: 3 ton

See also
 Orca (AUV)

References

Unmanned underwater vehicles